Alexandra Madarang Ilacad (born February 26, 2000) is a Filipino actress, singer, songwriter, host, dancer, vlogger and model. She appears in various commercials and shows of ABS-CBN, and is best known for playing Lexie Domingo in Luv U, Luna Dela Cuesta in The Killer Bride, Bobbie Salazar in Four Sisters Before the Wedding, and for joining Pinoy Big Brother: Kumunity Season 10 as a celebrity housemate.

Career

2008–2012: career beginnings, Goin Bulilit, and TOP 
She rose to prominence when she joined the kiddie gag show Goin' Bulilit in 2008. But even before that, she was already a familiar face in the Philippine television as a commercial model. Starting at the young age of two, she was first seen in various TV commercials for the brands Vaseline shampoo, Lactum 3+, Johnson's Baby Cologne, Cheez Whiz, McDonald's Happy Meal, Jollibee Kids Meal and many more.

Aside from that, she was also often seen playing minor roles for various Filipino seryes such as May Bukas Pa, Nasaan Ka Elisa?, A Beautiful Affair, and several episodes of Maalaala Mo Kaya. She has also played roles in the Philippine Cinema for films entitled For The First Time, The Reunion, and Amorosa: The Revenge. During her stay in Goin' Bulilit, she was first paired with fellow actor Nash Aguas for the episode Goin' Bulilit Presents: In My Dreams.

In 2012, she was launched as a singer in the group Tweens Of Pop together with fellow Bulilit stars Angel Sy, Mika Dela Cruz, and Noemi Oineza. The group released a self-titled EP under Star Music, its lead single Crush becoming the OST for the sitcom Luv U starring Miles Ocampo, Marco Gumabao, Angeli Gonzales, CJ Navato, Kiray Celis, and Igi Boy Flores.

2013–2016: Luv U, The NLex Loveteam and her debut in the music scene 
In 2013, she graduated in Goin Bulilit alongside fellow Bulilits Kobi Vidanes, Joseph Andre Garcia, Aaron Juntas, and Angel Sy.

She scored her first lead role as she was cast as Lexie Domingo in the second season of the youth-oriented comedy TV sitcom Luv U, the official starting point of her loveteam partnership with Gimme 5 member Nash Aguas, famously known as NLex. He played the puppy love of Lexie, Benjamin Jalbuena. From there, they have been paired again multiple times, their other projects include various MMK and Wansapanataym episodes.

She was also famously known in the business for playing the young Maria Mercedes, played by actress Jessy Mendiola.
In 2014, She and Aguas were paired again to do Camille and Drew in the television series Bagito which was based on the Wattpad series of the same name by Noreen Capili. Together with them was Ella Cruz, Angel Aquino, Ariel Rivera, Agot Isidro, the remaining members of Gimme 5 (Brace, Grae, Joaquin, and John), and many more. The NLex pair have proven the magic of their love team as the pilot episode of their first primetime drama series debuted strong in national TV ratings. Based on data from Kantar Media on Monday (November 17), the pilot episode of Bagito scored a national TV rating of 27.2%, or more than double of its rival program in GMA (11.3%) at the time.

In 2016, after its long run, Luv U bid its goodbye as it aired its last episode with Ilacad on front, leading the casts' performance of the show's—and her former group: Tweens of Pop's OST Crush.

She then created a YouTube channel and started uploading Beauty, Lifestyle, and Travel vlogs as well as Song Music Covers. 

In the same year, she and Aguas landed a role on the fourth season of the hit series Doble Kara (starred by versatile actress Julia Montes) as Patricia Hernandez and Paolo Acosta.

She also played the role Jewel, the veteran actress Angel Locsin's sister in the award-winning film Everything About Her with the Star of All Seasons, Vilma Santos.
In addition, she joined the reality music competition We Love OPM: The Celebrity Sing-Offs as part of Team Yeng: Oh My Girls. She, together with GirlTrends member Krissha Viaje, and 88rising artist Ylona Garcia were coached and trained by their mentor Pop Rock Royalty Yeng Constantino. The girls finished the competition as runner-ups just behind the grand winner, Team Erik's Tres Kantos.
Soon after finishing We Love OPM, she was launched as Star Music’s newest Teen Pop Rock Artist. She released her debut album To The Moon & Back with the spunky carrier single Pakipot, Suplado with music video directed by Kean Cipriano, featuring the other half of her loveteam, Nash Aguas. Her album has a total of 6 songs: Not Too Young, Kung Pwede Lang, Pakipot, Suplado, Kahit Saan, Kahit Kailan, Dream Boat, Puso, and an acoustic version of Kahit Saan, Kahit Kailan, also featuring Aguas. The songs from this album are all original and were written by her best friend, Eunice Jorge, the vocalist of rock band Gracenote.

Her debut album has also been proven a hit as it consistently charted in MOR 101.9's Biga10 for several weeks. Music videos of her songs Pakipot, Suplado and Kung Pwede Lang has also reached 5M and 3.4M views (as of May 2022) respectively.

2017–2020: Loveteam breakup and her solo career 
In 2017, she received her Silver Play Creator Award from YouTube for surpassing over 100k subscribers in ASAP Chillout. Currently, her channel has surpassed over 670k subscribers.

In the same year, Ilacad and Aguas were paired again in the Philippine crime drama television series The Good Son as Justine and Calvin, alongside Jerome Ponce, Loisa Andalio, Mccoy De Leon, Elisse Joson and Joshua Garcia. Also with them are outstanding actresses Eula Valdez, and Mylene Dizon, as well as John Estrada, Jeric Raval, and many more. The series lasted until April 13, 2018, and the ending also marked the conclusion of Ilacad and Aguas' long-time journey as a loveteam. The pair, with support from the management decided to split-up as a means for them to focus on each other's solo careers.

Apart from The Good Son, the actress also appeared in Star Cinema's action-comedy film Extra Service starring Arci Muñoz, Coleen Garcia, and Jessy Mendiola, and romantic-comedy film Finally Found Someone starring Popstar Royalty Sarah Geronimo and Box-Office King John Lloyd Cruz. Aside from these, she also played roles in Maalaala Mo Kaya as young Karla Estrada in the episode Autograph with Angelica Panganiban and Karla Estrada and as Joy in the episode Kulungan with Ms. Lorna Tolentino.

The actress also took part in ABS-CBN's 2017 Summer Station ID, Ikaw Ang Sunshine Ko along with BoyBand PH, Pinoy Big Brother Lucky Season 7 Big 4 Maymay Entrata, Kisses Delavin, Yong Muhajil, and Edward Barber, Tawag ng Tanghalan Top 3 Noven Belleza, Sam Mangubat and Froilan Canlas, and Kapamilya stars Sue Ramirez, Kristel Fulgar, Sharlene San Pedro, Kira Balinger, and Ylona Garcia.

In 2019, She landed the role of Luna Dela Cuesta, the 'rich spoiled brat daughter of Vito and Tessa' in The Killer Bride, the drama series starring Maja Salvador, Janella Salvador, Joshua Garcia and Geoff Eigenmann as well as Rose in the iWantTFC original series Call Me Tita starring Cherry Pie Picache, Agot Isidro, Mylene Dizon, Joanna Ampil, Angelica Panganiban, and Lorna Tolentino.

In October the same year, She scored her first lead film in the Philippine Cinema through the horror film Santigwar under Horseshoe Studios and Reality Entertainment. She played the role of Hasmin, a Santigwar herself. The film revolved around the journey of Hasmin as she discovers the truth that binds her family to the mythical creatures: Aswangs. Together with her on the film is Marlo Mortel, Marco Gallo, Paulo Angeles, Aubrey Miles, Michelle Liggayu, and many more.

She was also popularly known for playing the role of Bobbie Salazar (originally played by Bea Alonzo) in the prequel of the 2013 hit Four Sisters and a Wedding, 2020 film Four Sisters Before the Wedding. She was joined by actresses Belle Mariano, Charlie Dizon, and Gillian Vicencio as the newest Salazar sisters. The film became the No.1 top trending film as it arrived on Netflix Philippines and No.3 on Netflix Canada and UAE.

After four long years, in 2020, She came back to the music scene with new single Love at First Sight under new music label, OFF THE RECORD (under Exclusive License to MCA Music Inc.)

2021-present: new projects, new music, PBB, and KDLex 
In 2021, she was cast as Hannah Salcedo in Init Sa Magdamag, a Philippine television drama romance series broadcast by Kapamilya Channel starring Gerald Anderson, Yam Concepcion, JM de Guzman, Albie Casiño, Tetchi Agbayani, and many more where she was paired with actor Gab Lagman.

Apart from this, she also released a Frank Pole remix and Acoustic version of her 2020 single Love at First Sight and another single entitled Stay Right Here which she promoted on It's Showtime's segment Hide and Sing as TagoKanta #1, where AC Bonifacio successfully guessed her as the episode's celebrity singer.

She has also starred in another Maalaala Mo Kaya episode Libro with Kira Balinger and Yves Flores, where she wowed viewers with her amazing acting performance.

In the same year, she joined Pinoy Big Brother: Kumunity Season 10, the tenth overall season of Pinoy Big Brother, as part of the first batch of housemates in the Celebrity Edition, having been evicted on Day 71 alongside fellow housemate KD Estrada. Her time inside the Bahay ni Kuya was especially notable for opening the discussion on mental health having experienced body dysmorphia, an altercation between her and fellow housemate and Init Sa Magdamag co-star Albie Casiño, a conflict that occurred with fellow housemates livestreamer Eian Rances and comedian Brenda Mage, and her eventual closeness with Estrada that grew as they consoled each other from their individual episodes inside the house.

In 2022, After being evicted, she and Estrada began to appear on a number of shows and interviews together such as IWant ASAP, Kumunity: G sa Gabi with Robi Domingo, KAPAMILYA Journeys of Hope with Father Tito Caluag, PBB Kumu Big Arrival where they performed with musical icon Rico Blanco and ASAP Natin 'To as singers/performers. Ilacad was also chosen as the host of the online gameshow Quiz Mo Ko on the KUMU platform for the month of February—and eventually extended until March.

ABS-CBN launched a project for the victims of typhoon Odette—100 days of various fundraising activities starting from the 10-day By Request benefit concert. KDLex, Estrada and Ilacad's love team partnership were part of the first lineup of artists to perform. During their session, they have reached over 100,000 live viewers just from the KUMU stream alone.

Due to rising popularity, in one of the pair's ASAP Natin 'To stints, it was announced that they will headline a FanCon and the upcoming Dreamscape and iWantTFC series Run To Me(originally announced as More Than Words).

Shortly after the announcement, Ilacad and Estrada held the online fan concert event through KTX.ph entitled Closer: The KDLex Fan Con on February 26, in time with the actress' 22nd birthday. SVIP and VIP tickets for their concert reportedly became sold-out in just an hour, and several times more instantly after being restocked due to popular demand.

Ilacad also released her first single of the year, Paano which peaked #1 on iTunes Philippines. Although she has shared and made plenty of original songs during her stay in PBB, Paano is her first self-written song to be officially released to the public. Prior to the KDLex concert, the pair delivered their first single Misteryo under Star Music, as well as the Pinoy Big Brother: Kumunity Season 10 - Adult Edition eviction song, When I See You Again which the pair wrote and composed together during their time in the Big Brother House. In less than 12 hours, the two singles placed #1 and #2 respectively on the iTunes Philippines Top 100. 

Ahead of the 2022 Presidential Elections in the Philippines, Ilacad along with KD Estrada, Angela Ken, Antenorcruz, FANA, iDolls, Janine Berdin, JM Yosures, JMKO, Jona, Anji Salvacion, Lara Maigue, Reiven Umali, and the TNT Boys took part in the release of the reimagined version of Pag-Isipan Mo Ang Boto Mo which was originally composed and recorded by Jamie Rivera.

In celebration of Star Magic's 30th anniversary, the agency is set to launch SLAY—a new digital video magazine celebrating the beauty and power of women. On March 4, Ilacad took over Star Magic's KUMU account marking the celebration of Women's Month. In the same live, she announced that she will be gracing the magazine's first-ever cover.

Ahead of the official launch of SLAY, an advance screening and meet and greet via KTX.PH took place. Shortly after, Star Magic celebrated its 30th anniversary with the back-to-back launch of its digital video magazine SLAY and the fun travel reality show HOT Summer in Baler in Slay the Hot Summer event at the Resorts World Manila.

Prior to their series, Ilacad and Estrada starred as Janna Gives and Jamir Xyrus in Don't Cry Janna, a 4-episode KUMUserye directed by Cathy Garcia-Molina.

In May the same year, KDLex's digital series, Run To Me directed by Dwein Baltazar premiered in iWantTFC and KUM (later in Kapamilya Channel, Kapamilya Online Live, and A2Z). Produced by ABS-CBN Entertainment, Dreamscape Entertainment, iWantTFC, and KUMU, the series stars Ilacad and Estrada, Malou Crisologo, CJ Navato, Karl Gabriel, Ivan Carapiet, Margaux Montana, Henz Villariz, Matty Juniosa, and Haira Palaguitto. Along with the series, the pair also dropped their soundtrack album which reached no.1 on the local iTunes chart. Their official soundtrack album ranked atop the local album list, while five of its tracks placed in the top 10 songs chart, Hiwaga at 1st spot, followed by Palagi at 2nd, Kasi, Kung, Kahit at 3rd, Misteryo at 4th, and When I See You Again at 5th. The single versions of When I See You Again, and Misteryo also placed 6th and 8th respectively. In summation, seven out of the top 10 songs on iTunes Philippines at the time were from the pair.

In August, Star Magic toured in the United States as part of their 30th anniversary celebration. Ilacad were among the stars who staged the shows. The artists first performed in the Newport Performing Arts Theater, Resorts World Manila, followed by the US shows in Kings Theater, Brooklyn, The Warfield, San Francisco, and in the Saban Theatre, Beverly Hills.

Through their fan's support, Ilacad and Estrada landed a billboard in South Korea as the pair won the Best International Artist at IdolPick's 82nd Electronic Signboard Event, and again on the next month at its 83rd Electronic Signboard Event. IdolPick is a web service provided by Dong-A Ilbo where you can pick and vote for your favorite idol.

In November, the Philippine Educational Theater Association (PETA) officially welcomed Ilacad and Estrada to its family. They are set to lead PETA's return to producing original Filipino musicals through musical play Walang Aray, a humorous and entertaining take on Severino Reyes' 1898 classic zarzuela Walang Sugat. The play will run from February 17 to May 14, 2023.

Filmography

Television/digital

Films

Shows hosted

Concerts

Offline

Notes

Online

Musical Play

Music Videos

Discography

Singles

Albums

Extended plays

Soundtrack Albums

Appears on

As a featured artist

Station ID

OST

Composition credits

Awards and nominations

Movies and Television awards

Music awards

Creator awards

Personal life
In 2021, Ilacad attended college at Treston International College, and finished her marketing degree with a dean’s lister distinction and an impressive general weighted average of 1.0.

While inside the Big Brother house for Pinoy Big Brother: Kumunity Season 10, Ilacad asked for the help of the show's resident psychologist Dr. Randy Dellosa regarding insecurities in terms of her body. After the consultation, it was revealed that the actress is possibly diagnosed with major depressive disorder caused by body dysmorphia.

References

External links

2000 births
Living people
Star Magic
Star Music artists
ABS-CBN personalities
Filipino television actresses
Filipino child actresses
Filipino child singers
Contraltos
21st-century Filipino women singers
People from Parañaque
Actresses from Metro Manila
Pinoy Big Brother contestants
21st-century Filipino actresses
Filipino film actresses
Filipino women pop singers